Broadacres is an unincorporated community in the Rural Municipality of Mariposa No. 350, Saskatchewan, Canada.

See also 

 List of communities in Saskatchewan
 Hamlets of Saskatchewan
 Designated place

Mariposa No. 350, Saskatchewan
Unincorporated communities in Saskatchewan
Division No. 13, Saskatchewan